Gilbert Walker Kelly (July 23, 1878 – 1948) was an American football player and coach.  He served as the second head football coach at the University of Tennessee in 1901, compiling a record of 3–3–2.  Kelley replaced J. A. Pierce, the initial occupant of the newly created position. Before coaching at Tennessee, he played at Princeton University.

Head coaching record

References

1878 births
1948 deaths
Princeton Tigers football players
Tennessee Volunteers football coaches
Players of American football from Washington, D.C.